Hulin is a county-level city in Jixi prefecture, Heilongjiang province, People's Republic of China.

Hulin may also refer to:
 Hulín, town in Zlín Region, Czech Republic
 Dominique Hulin (born 1959), French mathematician
 Michel Hulin (born 1936), French philosopher
 Pierre-Augustin Hulin (1758–1841), French general under Napoleon Bonaparte
 Suicide of Rodney Hulin in prison in Texas in 1996
 Hulin Rocks, or the Maidens, County Antrim, Northern Ireland

See also
Hullin